Linda Amos (born 22 June 1946), later known by her married name Linda Skirton, is a British former competitive swimmer and freestyle specialist who represented Great Britain in the Olympics and European championships, and swam for England in the Commonwealth Games.

Career
Amos won a silver medal in the 4×100-metre freestyle relay as a member of the second-place British women's team at the 1962 European Aquatics Championships, and a bronze medal as part of the English team in the 4×110-yard freestyle relay at the 1962 Commonwealth Games.  She also competed in the preliminary heats of the women's 100-metre freestyle at the 1964 Summer Olympics in Tokyo.

Coaching
After retiring from competition swimming, she moved into coaching, and currently coaches at junior level at Millfield Preparatory School.

References

External links
Olympics.org Profile

1946 births
Living people
European Aquatics Championships medalists in swimming
British female freestyle swimmers
Olympic swimmers of Great Britain
Sportspeople from Portsmouth
Swimmers at the 1964 Summer Olympics
Commonwealth Games medallists in swimming
Commonwealth Games bronze medallists for England
Swimmers at the 1962 British Empire and Commonwealth Games
Medallists at the 1962 British Empire and Commonwealth Games